Vega Vio Nirwanda (born 20 July 1997 in Banyumas, Central Java, Indonesia) is an Indonesian badminton player. He was promoted to the Indonesia national badminton team in 2016.

Achievements

BWF International Challenge/Series 
Men's Singles

 BWF International Challenge tournament
 BWF International Series tournament

References

External links 
 

1999 births
Living people
People from Banyumas Regency
Sportspeople from Central Java
Indonesian male badminton players
21st-century Indonesian people